Inn District may refer to:
 Innviertel, a region in Upper Austria
 Inn District, Switzerland